Come Out and Play may refer to:

 Come Out and Play (film), a 2012 horror film
 Come Out and Play (Twisted Sister album), 1985
 Come Out and Play (Kim Wilde album), 2010
 "Come Out and Play" (The Offspring song), 1994
 "Come Out and Play" (Billie Eilish song), 2018